Cerebrotendinous xanthomatosis, also called cerebral cholesterosis, is an autosomal recessive form of xanthomatosis. It falls within a group of genetic disorders called the leukodystrophies.

Presentation
An inherited disorder associated with the deposition of a steroid known as cholestanol in the brain and other tissues and with elevated levels of cholesterol in plasma but with normal total cholesterol level; it is characterized by progressive cerebellar ataxia beginning after puberty and by juvenile cataracts, juvenile or infantile onset chronic diarrhea, childhood neurological deficit, and tendineous or tuberous xanthomas.

Genetics

CTX is associated with mutations in the CYP27A1 gene, located on chromosome 2q33-qter. The disorder is inherited in an autosomal recessive manner. This means the defective gene responsible for the disorder is located on an autosome (chromosome 2 is an autosome), and two copies of the defective gene (one inherited from each parent) are required in order to be born with the disorder. The parents of an individual with an autosomal recessive disorder both carry one copy of the defective gene, but they usually do not experience any signs or symptoms of the disorder.

Diagnosis

Elevated levels of serum cholestanol are diagnostic of CTX.  Alternatively analysis of 27-hydroxycholesterol and 7 alpha hydroxycholesterol can be used.  Genetic testing of the CYP27A1 gene is confirmatory and is increasingly being used as a first line test as part of symptom specific gene panels (genetic eye disease, ataxia, dementia).

Treatment
The standard treatment is chenodeoxycholic acid (CDCA) replacement therapy. Serum cholesterol levels are also tracked. If hypercholesterolemia is not controlled with CDCA, an HMG-CoA reductase inhibitor ("statins" such as simvastatin) can also be used.

Eponym
It was formerly known as "Van Bogaert–Scherer–Epstein syndrome".

See also
 Sitosterolemia
 List of cutaneous conditions

References

External links 
  GeneReviews/NCBI/NIH/UW entry on Cerebrotendinous Xanthomatosis

Lipid storage disorders
Autosomal recessive disorders
Skin conditions resulting from errors in metabolism
Rare diseases